Robert David Sierra Perez (born 13 November 1996) is a Venezuelan racing cyclist, who currently rides for Venezuelan amateur team Venezuela Pais Futuro.

Major results

2014
 3rd Time trial, National Junior Road Championships
2016
 1st  Points race, National Track Championships
2018
 2nd Scratch, National Track Championships
2019
 6th Overall Vuelta a Venezuela
2020
 1st  Road race, National Road Championships

References

External links

1996 births
Living people
Venezuelan male cyclists